Halus may refer to:
 Oryx, an ancient town in Arcadia also known as Halus (Aλοῦς)
 Halos (Thessaly) (Ἅλος), an ancient town in Phthiotis
 Halus (Assyria), a small place in Assyria